Cheboksary Reservoir (Russian: Чебоксарское водохранилище, Chuvash: Шупашкар шыв усравĕ, Şupaşkar şıv usravĕ) is an artificial lake in the central part of the Volga River and formed by the Cheboksary Dam in Novocheboksarsk.

The reservoir has partly flooded the Mari Depression.

The largest cities on the Reservoir are Nizhny Novgorod, Cheboksary and Kozmodemyansk.

Notes

Reservoirs in Mari El
Reservoirs in Chuvashia
Reservoirs in Nizhny Novgorod Oblast
Reservoirs in Russia
RCheboksary